Allocasuarina spinosissima is a basionym of Casuarina spinosissima. It is a shrub of the genus Allocasuarina native to a small area in the Wheatbelt and Goldfields-Esperance regions of Western Australia.

It is in tall heath and on sandplains and grows in sandy lateritic soils.

References

External links
  Occurrence data for Allocasuarina spinosissima from The Australasian Virtual Herbarium

spinosissima
Rosids of Western Australia
Fagales of Australia